Blake Desjarlais (born December 29, 1993) is a Canadian politician who has represented Edmonton Griesbach in the House of Commons since 2021. A member of the New Democratic Party (NDP), Desjarlais is of Cree and Métis descent, making him Alberta's only Indigenous member of Parliament (MP). He is also the first openly two-spirit individual to serve as an MP.

Early life and education 
Desjarlais was born on December 29, 1993 in Edmonton and grew up in the Fishing Lake Métis Settlement in northern Alberta. He is of Cree and Métis descent. His biological mother Brenda was a victim of the Sixties Scoop and spent her childhood in foster care, before working as a sex worker to support herself. When Brenda became pregnant with Blake, she sought help from her sister Grace Desjarlais, who took Blake and raised him herself. On his adoption by his aunt, Desjarlais stated that "she saved [his] life." Desjarlais's father was a carpenter who had died when Desjarlais was twelve.

Desjarlais attended secondary school in the "predominantly white town" of Elk Point, Alberta. He went on to study political science and indigenous studies at MacEwan University, however, he received racially motivated death threats and transferred to the University of Victoria. As a university student, Desjarlais was involved in student politics, and served as firekeeper of the Native Student Union (NSU). When Desjarlais completed his studies, he was appointed the national director of the Metis Settlements General Council in 2016.

Political career

2021 campaign 
Desjarlais had previously mulled running for an elected Indigenous leadership role. He was skeptical of running in partisan politics, seeing the various parties as only having interest in him to fulfill mandates regarding Indigenous and queer representation. Upon meeting representatives from the NDP, his impression was different, stating that "[The NDP] recognized me as a whole person with expertise in a vast variety of sectors."

During the 2021 election campaign, Desjarlais received support from several members of the Legislative Assembly (MLAs) – Janis Irwin, Chris Nielsen, former premier Rachel Notley and former education minister David Eggen. According to Desjarlais, during an evening canvassing shift, they had a racist interaction with five men who mistook him for being Chinese and blamed him for the COVID-19 pandemic.

Member of Parliament 
On election day, Desjarlais defeated Kerry Diotte, a two-term Conservative MP. The riding was previously considered a Conservative stronghold. MLA Janis Irwin likened Desjarlais's win to a disinterest in the Liberal Party and anger directed towards the Conservative Party due to their actions federally – such as MP Diotte's vote against the conservation therapy ban – and their association with the unpopular United Conservative Party (UCP) government provincially. As well, growing support of the People's Party voters siphoned off support from the Conservatives.

Desjarlais is the first openly two-spirit individual to have been elected to Parliament.

After being elected, Desjarlais was selected to be the New Democratic Party's deputy caucus chair for the 44th Parliament.

Electoral history

References

External links 

Members of the House of Commons of Canada from Alberta
New Democratic Party MPs
21st-century Canadian politicians
Politicians from Edmonton
First Nations politicians
Canadian LGBT Members of Parliament
Two-spirit people
Living people
MacEwan University alumni
Indigenous Members of the House of Commons of Canada
21st-century Canadian LGBT people
1993 births